This timeline describes major events in the history of animal welfare and animal rights.

Overview

Detailed timeline

See also 
Abolitionism (animal rights)
Animal welfare and rights in China
Animal welfare and rights in India
Animal welfare in the United States
History of vegetarianism
List of animal rights advocates
Speciesism
Timeline of animal welfare and rights in Europe
Timeline of animal welfare and rights in the United States
Timeline of cellular agriculture
Universal Declaration on Animal Welfare
Veganism
Women and animal advocacy

References

 
 
Animal welfare and rights legislation